The design of spacecraft covers a broad area, including the design of both robotic spacecraft (satellites and planetary probes), and spacecraft for human spaceflight (spaceships and space stations).

Origin 

Spacecraft design was born as a discipline in the 1950s and 60s with the advent of American and Soviet space exploration programs. Since then it has progressed, although typically less than comparable terrestrial technologies. This is for a large part due to the challenging space environment, but also to the lack of basic R&D, and to other cultural factors within the design community. On the other hand, another reason for slow space travel application design is the high energy cost, and low efficiency, for achieving orbit.  This cost might be seen as too high a "start-up-cost."

Areas of engineering involved

Spacecraft design brings together aspects of various disciplines, namely:

 Astronautics for mission design and derivation of the design requirements,
 Systems engineering for maintaining the design baseline and derivation of subsystem requirements,
 Communications engineering for the design of the subsystems which communicate with the ground (e.g. telemetry) and perform ranging.
 Computer engineering for the design of the on-board computers and computer buses. This subsystem is mainly based on terrestrial technologies, but unlike most of them, it must: cope with space environment, be highly autonomous and provide higher fault-tolerance.
 It may incorporate space qualified radiation-hardened components.
 Software engineering for the on-board software which runs all the on-board applications, as well as low-level control software. This subsystem is very similar to terrestrial real-time and embedded software designs,
 Electrical engineering for the design of the power subsystem, which generates, stores and distributes the electrical power to all the on-board equipment,
 Control theory for the design of the attitude and orbit control subsystem, which points the spacecraft correctly, and maintains or changes the orbit according to the mission profile; the hardware used for actuation and sensing in space is usually very specific to spacecraft,
 Thermal engineering for the design of the thermal control subsystem (including radiators, insulation and heaters), which maintains environmental conditions compatible with operations of the spacecraft equipment; This subsystem has very space-specific technologies, since in space, radiation and conduction usually dominate as thermal effects, by opposition with Earth where convection is typically the main one,
 Propulsion engineering for the design of the propulsion subsystem, which provides means of transporting the spacecraft from one orbit to another,
 Mechanical engineering for the design of the spacecraft structures and mechanisms, as well as the selection of materials for use in vacuum. These include beams, panels, and deployable appendages or separation devices (to separate from the launch vehicle).

Spacecraft Subsystems

Structure

The spacecraft bus carries the payload. Its subsystems support the payload and helps in pointing the payload correctly. It puts the payload in the right orbit and keeps it there. It provides housekeeping functions. It also provides orbit and attitude maintenance, electric power, command, telemetry and data handling, structure and rigidity, temperature control, data storage and communication, if required. The payload and spacecraft bus may be different units or it may be a combined one. The booster adapter provides the load-carrying interface with the vehicle (payload and spacecraft bus together).

The spacecraft may also have a propellant load, which is used to drive or push the vehicle upwards, and a propulsion kick stage. The propellant commonly used is a compressed gas like nitrogen, liquid such as monopropellant hydrazine or solid fuel, which is used for velocity corrections and attitude control. In a kick stage (also called apogee boost motor, propulsion module, or integral propulsion stage) a separate rocket motor is used to send the spacecraft into its mission orbit.
While designing a spacecraft, the orbit which is going to be used should be considered into the point as it affects attitude control, thermal design, and the electric power subsystem. But these effects are secondary as compared to the effect caused on the payload due to the orbit. Thus while designing the mission; the designer selects such an orbit which increases the payload performance. The designer even calculates the required spacecraft performance characteristics such as pointing, thermal control, power quantity, and duty cycle. The spacecraft is then made, which satisfies all the requirements.

Attitude Determination and Control

The attitude determination and control subsystem (ADCS) is used to change the attitude (orientation) of the spacecraft. There are some external torques acting on the spacecraft along the axis passing through its center of gravity which can reorient the spacecraft in any direction or can give it a spin. The ADCS nullifies these torques by applying equal and opposite torques using the propulsion and navigation. Moment of inertia of the body is to be calculated to determine the external torques which also requires determination of vehicle's absolute attitude using sensors. The property called 'gyroscopic stiffness' is used to reduce the spinning effect.
The simplest spacecraft achieve control by spinning or interacting with the Earth's magnetic or gravity fields. Sometimes they are uncontrolled. Spacecraft may have several bodies or they are attached to important parts, such as solar arrays or communication antennas which need individual attitude pointing. For controlling the appendage's attitude, actuators are often used, with separate sensors and controllers.
The various types of control techniques used are:
 Passive Control Techniques.
 Spin Control Techniques.
 Three-axis Control Techniques.

Telemetry, tracking, and command

Telemetry, tracking, and command (TT&C) is used for communication between spacecraft and the ground systems. The subsystem functions are:
 Controlling of spacecraft by the operator on Earth
 Receive the uplink commands, process and send them to other subsystems for implication.
 Receive the downlink commands from subsystems, process and transmit them to Earth.
 Inform constantly about the spacecraft position.

Communication

The process of sending information towards the spacecraft is called uplink or forward link and the opposite process is called downlink or return link. Uplink consists of commands and ranging tones where as downlink consists of status telemetry, ranging tones and even may include payload data. Receiver, transmitter and a wide-angle (hemispheric or omnidirectional) antenna are the main components of a basic communication subsystem. Systems with high data rates may even use a directional antenna, if required. The subsystem can provide us with the coherence between uplink and downlink signals, with the help of which we can measure range-rate Doppler shifts. The communication subsystem is sized by data rate, allowable error rate, communication path length, and RF frequency.

The vast majority of spacecraft communicate using radio antennas -- satellite communication.
A few spacecraft communicate using lasers—either directly to the ground as with LADEE; or between satellites as with OICETS, Artemis, Alphabus, and the European Data Relay System.

Power

The electrical power subsystem (EPS) consists of 4 subunits :
 Power Source (Battery, solar cell, fuelcells, thermoelectric couple)
 Storage unit (No. of batteries in series)
 Power Distribution (Cabling, switching, shock protection)
 Power Regulation and Control (To prevent battery overcharging and overheating)

Thermal

Thermal control subsystem (TCS) is used to maintain the temperature of all spacecraft components within certain limits. Both upper and lower limits are defined for each component. There are two limits, namely, operational (in working conditions) and survival (in non-working conditions). Temperature is controlled by using insulators, radiators, heaters, louvers and by giving proper surface finish to components.

Propulsion

The main function of the propulsion subsystem is to provide thrust so as to change the spacecraft's translational velocity or to apply torques to change its angular momentum. There is no requirement of thrust and hence even no requirement of propulsion equipment in a simplest spacecraft. But many of them need a controlled thrust in their system, so their design includes some form of metered propulsion (a propulsion system that can be turned on and off in small increments).
Thrusting is used for the following purposes: for changing the orbital parameters, to control attitude during thrusting, correct velocity errors, maneuver, counter disturbance forces (e.g., drag), and control and correct angular momentum. The propulsion subsystem includes a propellant, tankage, distribution system, pressurant, and propellant controls. It also includes thrusters or engines.

Space mission architecture 
Spacecraft design is always informed by the particular mission architecture of the spaceflight under consideration.  Typically, a variety of mission architectures can be envisioned that would achieve the overall objective of the flight, whether those objectives be to gather scientific data or merely transport cargo across the space environment to serve any variety of purposes, governmental or economic.

Spaceflight mission architectures will specify whether a spacecraft is to be autonomous or telerobotic, or even be crewed so as to deal with particular exigencies or goals of the mission. Other considerations include fast or slow trajectories, payload makeup and capacity, length of the mission, or the level of system redundancy so that the flight can achieve various degrees of fault-tolerance.

References 

 

 
Systems engineering